The 2019 Israeli Basketball Premier League Final Four, for sponsorship reasons the Winner League Final Four, the concluding tournament of the 2018–19 Israeli Basketball Premier League. The event was hosted at the Menora Mivtachim Arena, Tel Aviv from June 10 until June 13, 2019.

Maccabi Tel Aviv have won the title for the 53rd time after defeating Maccabi Rishon LeZion 89–75 in the Final. John DiBartolomeo was named the Final Four MVP.

Results

Bracket

Semifinals

Final

References

External links
IBA's official website (Hebrew)

2019 Final Four